"Crazy Horses" is a 1972 hit single by The Osmonds, the title track from the album of the same name. The song, the only hit record from the Osmonds to feature Jay Osmond as lead vocalist, reached number 14 on the US Billboard Hot 100 and number 2 in the UK Singles Chart.  The song has since been covered by numerous other performers.

Recording and content

Singer Merrill Osmond said of the song, "Before that, my brothers and I had been what's now called a boy band: all our songs were chosen for us by the record company. But now, having been successful, we wanted to freak out and make our own music. We were rehearsing in a basement one day when Wayne started playing this heavy rock riff. I came up with a melody and Alan got the chords. Within an hour, we had the song. I had always been the lead singer, but I sang Crazy Horses with Jay. The line "What a show, there they go, smoking up the sky" had to be sung higher, so I did that and Jay did the verses because his voice was growlier, and this track was heavier than anything we’d ever done." Merrill Osmond also added that the record company initially was skeptical the song would be successful but relented when it performed well in the charts (particularly in the United Kingdom, where the song proved to be a breakthrough for the quintet, as well as much of the rest of Europe).

Jay Osmond said:

Concerning the opening part of the song, Donny said:

Donny, the usual co-lead, had no vocal parts because his voice was changing, due to puberty.  The record was co-produced by Alan Osmond and Michael Lloyd, who had previously been in the psychedelic rock group The West Coast Pop Art Experimental Band.

Jay Osmond said, "'Crazy Horses' was way ahead of its time. It's a song about ecology and the environment: those 'crazy horses, smoking up the sky' are gas-guzzling cars, destroying the planet with their fumes. We shot the record sleeve in a junkyard, surrounded by big old cars."

During some of the live performances, as Jay stepped out front to sing lead, Merrill played the drums while Alan played bass guitar.

Censorship 
Sales of the song were prohibited in South Africa, where government censors interpreted the word 'horses' as referring to heroin.

The song was also banned in France when authorities believed the lyric "smoking up the sky" was about drugs.

Appreciation 

According to Donny, Ozzy Osbourne once told him that "Crazy Horses" was "one of his favorite rock and roll songs."

Cover versions
It has been covered by numerous other artists including The Sensational Alex Harvey Band, The Mission, Tank, Lawnmower Deth, Neal Morse, Mike Portnoy, The Frames, KMFDM, Electric Six, Pretty Maids, Tigertailz, and Butcher Babies.  Westlife covered the song live in 2003, and even performed the song alongside Donny Osmond. English band Pop Will Eat Itself sampled the record on their 1988 single "Def Con One".  The song was also covered by Tigertailz on the 2010 live album Bezerk: Live...Burnin' Fuel. The song was also covered by Mat Sinner on the solo album Back to the Bullet 1990. Donny Osmond recorded a new version of the song as a hidden bonus track on his 2002 covers album Somewhere in Time and performs the song frequently on his tours.  He did not sing on the original record.

In 1995, the electronic music group Utah Saints released a remixed version of the song, which reached number 50 in the UK singles chart. This version was reissued in 1999 and peaked at number 34.

Revolution 409 (which in reality was American band Redd Kross) covered the song on the SST Records 1989 compilation The Melting Pot.

Chart performance

References 

1972 songs
1972 singles
Songs written by Alan Osmond
Songs written by Merrill Osmond
Songs written by Wayne Osmond
The Osmonds songs
Environmental songs
Dutch Top 40 number-one singles
Number-one singles in France
MGM Records singles
Song recordings produced by Michael Lloyd
Songs about horses